Caroli Church is a former church in Malmö, Sweden. It was built in 1880. The church is named after king Charles XI of Sweden.

The first Caroli Church was built in 1680, in the same place as the current building. The church was also known as "The German Church" and the services was held in the German language for the German merchants and craftsmen of Malmö.

It was deconsecrated in 2010.

References

Churches in Malmö
17th-century Church of Sweden church buildings
1880 establishments in Sweden
Churches completed in 1880
Churches in the Diocese of Lund